Little by Little... is the third and final studio album by Harvey Danger. It is the band's first and only album with drummer Michael Welke, replacing the band's original drummer Evan Sult.

Release
The album was released on the band's own Phonographic Records label on September 13, 2005.  The CD version featured a second disc of B-sides and outtakes in deluxe packaging.  In an effort to "embrace the indisputable fact of music in the 21st century", the band made the album available as a free download via BitTorrent and on the band's website.  They pointed out that "it’s important that people understand the free download concept isn’t a frivolous act. It’s a key part of our promotional campaign, along with radio and press promotion, live shows, and videos. It’s a bet that the resources of the Internet can make possible a new way for musicians to find their audience – and forge a meaningful artistic career built on support from cooperative, not adversarial, relationships."

On April 19, 2006, the band announced on their MySpace blog that the album had been picked up by Olympia-based label Kill Rock Stars for nationwide release on July 25, 2006. The re-release's track listing, song order, and album art is different from the Phonographic Records release. The band did some limited touring to accompany the release.

Album and song titles
The album title is taken from a quote by Melvyn Douglas's character Homer Bannon in the 1963 film Hud: "Little by little, the look of the country changes because of the men we admire."

The title of the song "Cream and Bastards Rise" is a quote by Paul Newman's character in Harper (1966).  "Happiness Writes White" is a maxim first put forth by French writer Henry de Montherlant.

"The Piano Lesson" features someone attempting to play Beethoven's "Für Elise" before switching to Scott Joplin's "The Entertainer."

"Wine, Women and Song" is the first line of "Villanelle of the Poet's Road" by Ernest Christopher Dowson.

Track listing
All songs written by Aaron Huffman, Jeff J. Lin and Sean Nelson.

Phonographic Records release (2005)

Kill Rock Stars release (2006)

Personnel
Personnel per liner notes.

Musicians
Harvey Danger:
 Aaron Huffman – Bass, guitar, design
 Jeff J. Lin – Guitar, piano, string and horn arrangements
 Sean Nelson – vocals
 Michael Welke – drums
Additional musicians:
 Rachel Bowman – Backing vocals
 Jacob Hoffman – Backing vocals, French horn
 John Roderick – Guitar
 Greg Powers – Trombone
 Steve Creswell – Viola
 Phil Peterson – Cello

Production
 John Goodmanson – Production, engineering, mixing
 Steve Fisk – Production, engineering, mixing, ARP
 Justin Armstrong – Assistant engineering
 Scotty Crane – Assistant engineering
 Greg Calbi – Mastering
 Ed Brooks – Mastering
 YTJE – Artwork
 Ryan Schierling – Photography
 Erik Speckman – Encoding and IT

Release history

References

External links
 Harvey Danger's official site, including a Studio diary

2005 albums
Harvey Danger albums
Self-released albums
Albums free for download by copyright owner
Albums produced by Steve Fisk
Albums produced by John Goodmanson
Albums recorded at Robert Lang Studios